Kalyn Heffernan is an MC for the band Wheelchair Sports Camp. Heffernan was born with the genetic disorder osteogenesis imperfecta. She was born in Denver, spent her early life in Southern California, and returned to Denver at age 8.  Heffernan is a community activist, participating in a 2017 ADAPT sit-in at Senator Cory Gardner's office to protest a proposed healthcare bill that would have cut Medicaid by $722 billion. In 2018, Heffernan announced her intention to "sit" as a candidate for the 2019 Denver mayoral race.

Heffernan identifies as queer, and was named as one of "Eight Openly Queer Rappers to Watch" by ColorLines. She received a 2016 Westword MasterMind award in recognition of her work co-founding Royalty Free Haiti, a partnership between artists in Haiti and Denver and in 2018, Westword's "Best of Denver" named her the year's "Best Activist Musician."

References 

Living people
Year of birth missing (living people)
Artists with disabilities
Queer artists
Musicians from Denver
American rappers
American women rappers
Activists from Colorado
American disability rights activists
21st-century American rappers
21st-century American women musicians
21st-century women rappers